The Roman Catholic Diocese of Debrecen–Nyíregyháza is a diocese located in the cities of Debrecen and Nyíregyháza in the Ecclesiastical province of Eger in Hungary.

History
 31 May 1993: Established as Diocese of Debrecen – Nyíregyháza from the Metropolitan Archdiocese of Eger and Diocese of Szeged–Csanád

Leadership
 Bishops of Debrecen–Nyíregyháza (Roman rite)
 Bishop Nándor Bosák (31 May 1993 – 21 September 2015)
Bishop Ferenc Palánki (21 September 2015 – present)

See also
Roman Catholicism in Hungary
List of Roman Catholic dioceses in Hungary

Sources
 GCatholic.org
 Catholic Hierarchy

External links
 
  
Official site of Debreceni Szent Anna Főplébánia

Roman Catholic dioceses in Hungary
Christian organizations established in 1993
Debrecen
Roman Catholic dioceses and prelatures established in the 20th century
Debrecen-Nyiregyhaza, Roman Catholic Diocese of